Ludovic Janvier (24 October 1934, Paris – 18 January 2016, Ivry-sur-Seine) was a French novelist, poet, essayist, and short stories writer. He was the grandson of Haitian writer and politician Louis-Joseph Janvier.

Work

Novels 
1968: La Baigneuse, Éditions Gallimard
1974: Face, Gallimard
1984: Naissance, Gallimard
1988: Monstre, va, Gallimard
2012: La Confession d'un bâtard du siècle, Fayard

Short stories 
1993: Brèves d’amour, Gallimard
1996: En mémoire du lit, Brèves d'amour 2, Gallimard, Prix Goncourt de la Nouvelle
2002: Encore un coup au cœur, Brèves d'amour 3 (short stories), Gallimard
2002: Tue-le, Gallimard
2016: Apparitions, Brèves d'amour 4 (short stories), Gallimard

Poetry 
1987:  La Mer à boire, Gallimard
1992: Entre jour et sommeil, Seghers
1998: Comme un œil, dessins de Jean-Marie Queneau, Vézelay, Éditions de la Goulotte
2001: Doucement avec l'ange, Gallimard
2003: Bon d'accord, allez je reste !, inventaire/invention
2004: Des rivières plein la voix, Gallimard, 
2006: Une poignée de monde, Gallimard

Essays 
1964: Une parole exigeante, Éditions de Minuit
1966: Pour Samuel Beckett, Minuit
1969: Samuel Beckett par lui-même, Éditions du Seuil
1998: Bientôt le soleil, Flohic Éditions

External links 
 Je n’écrirai pas que je suis mort, pourquoi écrire que je suis né ? on France Culture (20 January 2016)
 Mort de Ludovic Janvier, spécialiste de Samuel Beckett on Le Figaro (22 January 2016)
 Ludovic Janvier on Gallimard
 Ludovic Janvier - La confession d'un bâtard du siècle on YouTube

20th-century French dramatists and playwrights
20th-century French essayists
20th-century French poets
21st-century French poets
21st-century French male writers
20th-century French novelists
21st-century French novelists
French male short story writers
French short story writers
English–French translators
Prix Goncourt de la nouvelle recipients
1934 births
Writers from Paris
2016 deaths
Deaths from cancer in France
20th-century French male writers
French male non-fiction writers
20th-century translators